Osinki is a rural locality (a settlement) in Abramovskoye Rural Settlement, Talovsky District, Voronezh Oblast, Russia. The population was 179 as of 2010. There are 3 streets.

Geography 
Osinki is located 32 km northeast of Talovaya (the district's administrative centre) by road. Abramovka is the nearest rural locality.

References 

Rural localities in Talovsky District